Italy competed at the 2002 Winter Olympics in Salt Lake City, United States.

With Turin being the host of the 2006 Winter Olympics, an Italian segment featuring singers Irene Grandi and Elisa was presented at the closing ceremony.

Medalists

Alpine skiing

Men

Men's combined

Women

Women's combined

Biathlon

Men

Men's 4 × 7.5 km relay

Women

Women's 4 × 7.5 km relay

 1 A penalty loop of 150 metres had to be skied per missed target. 
 2 Starting delay based on 10 km sprint results. 
 3 One minute added per missed target. 
 4 Starting delay based on 7.5 km sprint results.

Bobsleigh

Men

Women

Cross-country skiing

Men
Sprint

Pursuit

 1 Starting delay based on 10 km C. results. 
 C = Classical style, F = Freestyle

4 × 10 km relay

Women
Sprint

Pursuit

 2 Starting delay based on 5 km C. results. 
 C = Classical style, F = Freestyle

4 × 5 km relay

Figure skating

Men

Women

Pairs

Ice Dancing

Freestyle skiing

Men

Luge

Men

(Men's) Doubles

Women

Short track speed skating

Men

Women

Skeleton

Men

Women

Ski jumping

Snowboarding

Men's parallel giant slalom

Men's halfpipe

Women's parallel giant slalom

Women's halfpipe

Speed skating

Men

Women

References
 Olympic Winter Games 2002, full results by sports-reference.com

Nations at the 2002 Winter Olympics
2002
Winter